Travis James Wilson (born December 14, 1993) is a former American football tight end. He played college football for Utah Utes as a quarterback. Wilson led the Utes to the most wins by a quarterback in school history. He went undrafted in 2016 and he signed with the Los Angeles Rams in 2017. He tried out for the team while working at a surf shop in California.

High school career 
Wilson attended San Clemente High School in San Clemente, California. He set the school's record in career passing yards and total offense. As a senior, he threw for 24 touchdowns and 2,289 yards and he was a three-star recruit by Rivals and ESPN while earning a four-star rating by 247Sports. In May, 2011 Wilson committed to the University of Utah to play college football.

Professional career
On March 2, 2017, Wilson signed with the Los Angeles Rams as an undrafted free agent. He was waived during final roster cuts on September 3, 2017.

References 

1993 births
Living people
Los Angeles Rams players
Utah Utes football players